The 2002 Welwyn Hatfield District Council election took place on 2 May 2002 to elect members of Welwyn Hatfield District Council in Hertfordshire, England. One third of the council was up for election and the Conservative Party gained overall control of the council from the Labour Party.

After the election, the composition of the council was:
Conservative 26
Labour 22

Election result
The results saw the Conservatives win a majority of 4 on the council after gaining 3 seats from Labour. The Conservatives gained seats in Hatfield West and Sherrards wards, as well as one of the 2 seats being contested in Hatfield North, where 3 recounts were needed to separate the top 4 candidates who all finished within 17 votes of each other. The Liberal Democrats failed to win any seats, but came second in 4 wards and were within 22 votes of the Conservative winner in Handside ward. Overall turnout in the election was 35.3%, a rise of about 3% on the 2000 election after all voters were able to get postal votes for the first time.

Ward results

References

2002
2002 English local elections
2000s in Hertfordshire